Bethanie Mattek-Sands and Sania Mirza were the defending champions but Mattek-Sands decided not to participate.
Mirza played alongside Zheng Jie, but lost in the semifinals to Gabriela Dabrowski and Shahar Pe'er.
Anna-Lena Grönefeld and Květa Peschke won the title, defeating Dabrowski and Pe'er in the final, 6–0, 6–3.

Seeds

  Sania Mirza /  Zheng Jie (semifinals)
  Anna-Lena Grönefeld /  Květa Peschke (champions)
  Chan Hao-ching /  Darija Jurak (first round)
  Olga Govortsova /  Alicja Rosolska (semifinals)

Draw

Draw

References
 Main Draw

Brussels Openandnbsp;- Doubles
2013 Doubles